Audrey Mae Sheppard Williams (February 28, 1923 – November 4, 1975) was an American musician known for being the first wife of country music singer and songwriter Hank Williams, the mother of Hank Williams Jr. and the grandmother of Hank Williams III and Holly Williams.

Early life and marriages
Sheppard was born in Banks, Alabama, the daughter of Artie Mae (née Harden; 1903–1976) and Charles "Shelton" Sheppard. She grew up on a farm owned and worked by her parents. Sheppard's first husband was James Erskine Guy, whom she married when she was a high-school senior. The couple separated soon after their daughter Lycrecia was born in 1941.

Sheppard met Hank Williams in 1943.  Despite the objections of Williams's mother and bandmates, Sheppard was added to the band as an occasional singer and upright bass player.  In December 1944, the two were married 10 days after the finalization of Sheppard's divorce from her first husband.  The ceremony was performed by a justice of the peace at the officiant's gas station in Andalusia, Alabama.

Music career
Soon after their wedding, Williams took the role of her husband's unofficial manager, a position previously held by her mother-in-law, Lillie Williams.  The couple visited Nashville with the intent of meeting songwriter and music publisher Fred Rose of Acuff-Rose Publishing.  The meeting resulted in Hank Williams recording two singles for Sterling Records: “Never Again” in December 1946 and “Honky Tonkin’” in February 1947. Both proved successful and a contract was signed with MGM Records in 1947, with Rose becoming the singer's official manager and record producer.

Williams, however, began to push for her own spot in the limelight. Country music biographer Colin Escott wrote "Her duets with Hank were like an extension of their married life in that she fought him for dominance on every note." Having recorded several duets with her husband, Audrey was featured on the recordings of "Lost on the River", "I Heard My Mother Praying for Me", "Dear Brother", "Jesus Remembered Me", "The Pale Horse and His Rider", "Jesus Died for Me", "Help Me Understand", "Something Got a Hold of Me", "I Want to Live and Love", and "Where the Soul of Man Never Dies".

Marriage difficulties and family
In early 1948, tension started to grow in the Williams marriage when Hank started to again abuse alcohol, a problem he brought with him to their marriage from the beginning.  Williams left her husband, giving him the choice of alcohol or her. They eventually reunited.

On May 26, 1949, Williams gave birth to the couple's only child, Randall Hank Williams. After Williams's appearance at the Grand Ole Opry following the birth of her son, she officially renamed the child Hank Williams Jr.

When her husband expressed a desire to adopt her daughter, Audrey refused, fearing he would take her if they divorced.

Divorce from Williams
On December 31, 1951, after allegations of mutual infidelities and the resumption of her husband's health problems, Williams called from a hotel and told Hank to be out of their Tennessee house by the time she returned. Replying to her with a seemingly prophetic statement, Hank Williams stated, "Audrey, I won't live another year without you."

In June 1952, the couple divorced. She was awarded the house, their child, and half of her ex-husband's future royalties on the condition that she never remarry.

In 1953, months after Hank Sr.'s death, Williams paid his second wife, Billie Jean Jones, $30,000 to relinquish the title of "Hank Williams's Widow". Both women had been using the description professionally. Jones agreed to Williams's terms.

Later life and death
Williams and her son, Hank Jr., became estranged after he turned 18. She never remarried. She died of congestive heart failure on November 4, 1975, at the age of 52.

Cultural references

Music
Audrey is mentioned in the Johnny Cash song: "The Night Hank Williams Came to Town."
Audrey is referenced in "Tangled Up Roses" by Shooter Jennings and in the Hank Williams Jr. song, "The Conversation" with Waylon Jennings
Audrey is referenced in the song “Everything She Ain’t” by Hailey Whitters in the line “Audrey to your Hank”.
Audrey is referenced in "Mrs. Hank Williams" by Fred Eaglesmith

Film depictions
Susan Oliver played Audrey in the 1964 biopic Your Cheatin' Heart opposite George Hamilton as Hank.
Allyn Ann McLerie played Audrey in the 1983 television biopic Living Proof: The Hank Williams Jr. Story opposite Richard Thomas as Hank Williams, Jr.
Elizabeth Olsen played Audrey in the 2015 biopic I Saw the Light opposite Tom Hiddleston as Hank.

Discography

Singles

External links

References

1923 births
1975 deaths
American women country singers
American country singer-songwriters
People from Pike County, Alabama
Country musicians from Alabama
20th-century American singers
Alcohol-related deaths in Tennessee
Drug-related deaths in Tennessee
20th-century American women singers
Singer-songwriters from Alabama